Catherine Byrne may refer to:

Catherine Byrne (Irish politician) (born 1956), Irish Fine Gael politician
Catherine Byrne (Nevada politician) (born 1964), American politician from Nevada
Catherine Byrne (athlete), 1992 winner of the NCAA Woman of the Year Award